An offramp is an exit ramp on an interchange road.

Offramp, Off Ramp, etc., may also refer to:

Offramp (album), a 1982 album by Pat Metheny Group
Off-Ramp, a DC Comics superhero character
"Off Ramp", a 2015 episode of The Leftovers
Off ramp (diplomacy), peaceful compromise offered as an exit strategy